The 2017–18 Divizia A1 season was the 69th season of the Divizia A1, the highest professional volleyball league in Romania. VM Zalău was the defending champion. At the end of the season, Tricolorul LMV Ploiești won their first title. UV Timișoara and CSS 2 Baia Mare were relegated.

Competition format
The competition format will be the same as in the previous season.

 12 teams played the regular season, consisting in a double-legged round robin format.
 At the end of the regular season, teams are split into two groups, one of them composed by the first six teams and the other one by the rest. In this second stage all points of the regular season are counted and the teams will face each other from its group twice.

Team changes 

Promoted from Divizia A2
 Universitatea Cluj
 CSS 2 Baia Mare
 UV Timișoara

Relegated to Divizia A2
 VCM Piatra Neamț

Excluded teams
Știința Bacău and Volei Caransebeș withdrew from Divizia A1.

Teams

Regular season

Play-off

Play-out

References

External links
Official site of the Romanian Basketball Federation
Voleiromania.ro (Romanian)

2017-18
Romanian
2017 in men's volleyball
2018 in men's volleyball